The Prix de l'État (English: National Prize) of the French Academy of Sciences is a science award founded by the French National Convention in 1795 and financed by state funds. It is awarded in the fields of mathematics, physics, mechanics, computer science, earth sciences, biology and chemistry and is endowed with 7600 euros. It is awarded annually, with the exception of physics, which is awarded every four years.

Laureates since 1960 
 1960: Szolem Mandelbrojt
 1961: Albert Policard
 1962: Jacques Dixmier
 1963: Pierre Nicolle
 1964: Laurent Schwartz
 1965: René Wurmser
 1966: André Guinier
 1967: Jean Dausset
 1968: Gustave Choquet
 1969: Xavier Duval
 1970: René Thom
 1971: Pierre Chatelain
 1972: Pierre Lelong
 1973: Pierre Douzou
 1974: André Martin
 1975: Marcel Bessis
 1976: Jacques Tits
 1977: Hélène Charniaux-Cotton
 1978: Noël Felici
 1979: Marc Fellous
 1980: Jean-Pierre Kahane
 1981: Lionel Salem
 1982: Evry Schatzman
 1983: Jean-Charles Schwartz
 1984: Yves Meyer
 1985: Stratis Avrameas
 1986: Claude Lorius
 1987: Jean Normant
 1988: Franck Laloë
 1989: Francis Durst
 1990: Jean-Pierre Hansen
 1991: Maurice Israël
 1992: Gilles Pisier
 1993: Jacques Taxi
 1994: Roger Cayrel
 1995: Jean Talairach
 1996: Jean-Michel Bony
 1997: Jean-Loup Gervais
 1998: Pierre Gadal
 1999: Bernard Maurey
 2000: Jean-Paul Behr
 2001: Camille Cohen
 2002: Émile Miginiac
 2003: Louis Boutet de Monvel
 2004: Joël Moreau
 2005: Jean-Michel Gérard
 2006: Hervé Sentenac
 2007: Nicolas Burq
 2008: Anny Jutand
 2009: François Amiranoff, Victor Malka, Patrick Mora
 2010: Richard Miles
 2011: Bernard Helffer
 2012: Michel Ephritikhine
 2013: Andreas Hoecker
 2015: Yves Guivarc'h
 2016: Christian Serre
 2017: Pierre Le Doussal
 2018: Christian Giaume, François Michel
 2019: Michela Varagnolo, Éric Vasserot
 2020: Anna Proust
 2021: Marie-Hélène Schune
 2022: Christophe Plomion

References 

Lists of award winners
Awards established in 1795
Awards of the French Academy of Sciences